The following list includes companies based in Japan which produce (or have produced in the past) guitars and other related string instruments which are sold by other brands under original equipment manufacturer (OEM) arrangements.

List of Japanese OEM guitar manufacturers

Sources

External links

Musical instrument manufacturing companies of Japan